Taylor County Courthouse may refer to:

 Taylor County Courthouse (Georgia), Butler, Georgia
 Taylor County Courthouse (Iowa), Bedford, Iowa
 Taylor County Courthouse (Wisconsin), Medford, Wisconsin